Old town is the historic core of various cities.

Old Town may also refer to:

Places

Bosnia and Herzegovina
 Old town of Visoki

Bulgaria
 Old Town (Plovdiv)

Canada
 Old Town, British Columbia
 Old Town Lunenburg, Nova Scotia
 Old Town, Toronto

China
 Old Town of Lijiang
 Old Town of Shanghai

Czech Republic
 Old Town (Prague)

Germany
 Old town Osnabrück
 Old town of Regensburg with Stadtamhof

Ireland
 Old Town, County Roscommon
 Oldtown, Dublin
 Oldtown, Letterkenny

Jerusalem
 Old City (Jerusalem)

Kenya
 Mombasa Old Town, Kenya

Libya
 Old Town of Ghadamès, Libya

Lithuania
 Kaunas Old Town
 Vilnius Old Town

Malaysia 
 Old Town, Petaling Jaya

Norway
 Old Town, Oslo

Poland
 Białystok Osiedle Centrum
 Bydgoszcz Old City
 Gdańsk Old Town
 Kraków Old Town
 Lublin Old Town
 Opole Old Town
 Police Old Town
 Poznań Old Town
 Warsaw Old Town
 Wrocław Old Town
 Zamość Old City

Serbia
 Old Town (Ivanjica)

Slovakia
 Old Town, Bratislava

Sri Lanka
 Old Town of Galle and its Fortifications

Sweden
 Old Town of Stockholm

Switzerland
 Old Town of Bern

Ukraine
 Old Town (Lviv)

United Kingdom
 Old Town, Barnsley, England
 Old Town, Chard, England
 Old Town, Croydon, England
 Old Town, Edinburgh, Scotland
 Old Town, Isles of Scilly, England
 Old Town, Mansergh, a hamlet in Mansergh, Cumbria, England
 Old Town, Stevenage, England
 Old Town, West Yorkshire, England

United States
 Old Town (Franklin, Tennessee)
 Old Town (Key West), Florida
 Old Town (Lansing, Michigan)
 Old Town (Mississippi)
 Old Town, Baltimore, Maryland, USA
 Old Town, California (disambiguation), several places, including:
 Old Town, Kern County, California
 Old Town, Marin County, California
 Old Town (Simonian Farms)
 Old Town, Calhoun County, Mississippi
 Old Town, Chicago, Illinois, USA
 Old Town, Florida, USA
 Old Town, Indiana
 Old Town, Maine, USA
 Old Town, North Carolina (disambiguation), several places, including:
 Old Town, Brunswick County, North Carolina
 Old Town, Forsyth County, North Carolina
 Old Town, San Diego, California, USA
 Old Town, Staten Island, New York, USA
 Old Town Albuquerque, New Mexico, USA
 Old Town Center Historic District, Eastham, Massachusetts, USA
 Old Town Chinatown, Portland, Oregon, USA
 Old Town Eureka, California, USA
 Old Town Fairfax, Virginia, USA
 Old Town Pasadena, California, USA
 Oldtown, Idaho
 Oldtown, Kentucky
 Old Town, Wichita, Kansas
 Old Town (house)

Music
 "Old Town" (song), 1982 song by Phil Lynott
 Old Town Records, American record label which existed 1953–1966

Transit
 Old Town station (A-train), Lewisville, Texas, United States
 Old Town station (Staten Island Railway), New York, United States
 Old Town Transit Center, San Diego, California, United States
 Old Town/Chinatown MAX Station, Portland, Oregon, United States
 King Street–Old Town station, Alexandria, Virginia, United States
 Oldtown railway station, Letterkenny, Ireland

Other uses
 Old Town (A Song of Ice and Fire), a city in the A Song of Ice and Fire series
 Old Town (amusement park), in Kissimmee, Florida, USA
 The Old Town, an open-air museum in Aarhus, Denmark

See also
 Old City (disambiguation)
 Old Town Historic District (disambiguation)
 Old Town Township (disambiguation)
 Oldtown (disambiguation)
 "There'll Be a Hot Time in the Old Town Tonight"
 Old Town Cemetery (disambiguation)
 Stare Miasto (disambiguation)
 Altstadt, a German term with a similar meaning
 Furuichi (disambiguation), a Japanese term with a similar meaning